Gweneth Whitteridge FRCP (20 October 1910 – 3 September 1993), a British scholar of medical history, was president of the History of Medicine Society of the Royal Society of Medicine of the United Kingdom from 1983 to 1985. She studied Mediaeval French at Lady Margaret Hall, Oxford from 1929 and then palaeography at the Sorbonne, before becoming archivist to St Bartholomew's Hospital, London, of which she wrote brief histories.

Works
 The Royal Hospital of Saint Bartholomew (1952)
 A brief history of the Hospital of Saint Bartholomew [with Veronica Stokes] (1963)
 William Harvey and the circulation of the blood (1969)

References 

Presidents of the History of Medicine Society
Fellows of the Royal College of Physicians
1910 births
1993 deaths
English archivists
People educated at the City of London School for Girls